The 1949–50 Houston Cougars men's basketball team represented the University of Houston in the 1949–50 season of college basketball. It was their fifth year of season play. The head coach for the Cougars was Alden Pasche, who was serving in his 5th year in that position.  The team played its home games at Jeppesen Gymnasium on-campus in Houston and were members of the Gulf Coast Conference.  Houston captured its third conference regular season title.

Roster

Schedule

|-
!colspan=7|Regular season

References

Houston Cougars men's basketball seasons
Houston
Houston